Kebar is a ghost town in Graham County, Kansas, United States.

History
Kebar was issued a post office in 1880. The post office was discontinued in 1898.

References

Further reading

External links
 Graham County maps: Current, Historic, KDOT

Former populated places in Graham County, Kansas
Former populated places in Kansas